Maskeliya is a town in the Central  Province of Sri Lanka. It is the site of the 1974 crash of Martinair Flight 138, the worst air disaster in Sri Lanka.

It is known for its mountains, waterfalls, unique ethnic background and estates. The actual town is built on a combination of three estates. Despite the aircraft crash, Because of Adams peak, Maskeliya has been a popular destination in Sri Lanka.

See also

List of towns in Central Province, Sri Lanka

References

Populated places in Sri Lanka
Populated places in Nuwara Eliya District